South West Wales is one of the regions of Wales comprising the unitary authorities of Swansea, Neath Port Talbot, Carmarthenshire and Pembrokeshire.

Definition
This definition is used by a number of government agencies and private organisations including:

BBC
Welsh Government
South West Wales Economic Forum (SWWEF)
South West Wales Integrated Transport Consortium (SWWITCH)
South West Wales Tourism Partnership (SWWTP)
Travel About Britain
West Cheshire & North Wales Chamber of Commerce

A different definition is used in the EU Nomenclature of Territorial Units for Statistics, which refers to South West Wales as a subdivision of West Wales and the Valleys comprising Carmarthenshire, Ceredigion and Pembrokeshire.

History
The area that is now considered to be South West Wales was established as Deheubarth by Hywel Dda in around the year 920. Although not a kingdom per se, it was ruled dynastically and fought over for centuries, until the conquest of Wales by Edward I, completed in 1283, when it was divided into the historic counties that exist today.

See also
South Wales
West Wales
Swansea Bay City Region
Mid Wales
North West Wales

References

External links
One Big Garden (gardens and parkland in South West Wales)
Visit Wales: South West Wales
Inspirational South West Wales
 Wales.com: south west Wales

Regions of Wales